The Orton Cone Box Show was a biennial ceramic art exhibition for small work that started in  Indiana, United States and is now held in Kansas, United States. It was open to submissions from across the world. The show's title was taken from the constraint on submissions, which must fit within the box in which Orton's pyrometric cones are shipped, 3" x 3" x 6" (approx. 75 mm x 75 mm x 150 mm.)

Submissions were adjudicated by up to four members of the ceramics art community in the United States, and exhibited during following year's the conference of the US National Council on Education for the Ceramic Arts.

Dates & locations
1975, Purdue University
1977, University of Kansas
1979, University of Kansas
1994, Baker University
1996, Baker University
1998, Baker University
2000, Baker University
2002, Baker University
2004, Baker University
2006, Baker University
2008, Baker University
2010, Lawrence Arts Center
2012, Lawrence Arts Center
2016, Hilliard Gallery, Kansas City, Missouri
2018, Bracker’s Good Earth Clays, Lawrence, Kansas 
2020, Bracker’s Good Earth Clays, Lawrence, Kansas  (final one)

Shows from the 1990s 

The show experienced a period of inactivity following the departure of Bill Bracker from Kansas University shortly after the third show. In 1993 Inge Balch, Professor of Art at Baker University, Kansas, asked Bracker for his blessing to revive the show.

With the support of both Orton and the University the fourth show opened in 1994 at the Holt-Russell Gallery at Baker University. Work from potters from several countries have been exhibited. Subsequently the Cone Box Show has become a biennial event.

Notes 

Art biennials
American pottery
Baker University